The following is a list of the Dead Sea Scrolls from the cave 3 near Qumran.

Description
Wadi Qumran Cave 3 was discovered on 14 March 1952 by the ASOR team. The cave initially yielded fragments of Jubilees and the Copper Scroll.

List of manuscripts
Some resources for more complete information on the Dead Sea Scrolls are the book by Emanuel Tov, "Revised Lists of the Texts from the Judaean Desert" for a complete list of all of the Dead Sea Scroll texts, as well as the online webpages for the Shrine of the Book and the Leon Levy Collection, both of which present photographs and images of the scrolls and fragments themselves for closer study.  Information is not always comprehensive, as content for many scrolls has not yet been fully published.
{|class="wikitable"
|-
! Fragment or Scroll Identifier
! Fragment or Scroll Name
! Alternative Identifier
! English Bible Association
! Language
! Date/Script
! Description
! Reference
|-
! colspan="8" style="background:#b8c7d6;"|
Qumran Cave 3
|-
| 3QEzek || Ezekiel
|3Q1|| Ezekiel 16:31–33 ||Hebrew
|rowspan=3|Herodian
|
|
|-
|3QPs || Psalms
|3Q2|| Psalm 2:6–7
|| Hebrew
|
|
|-
|3QLam || Lamentations
|3Q3|| Lamentations 1:10–12; 3:53–62 || Hebrew
|
|
|-
|3QpIsa || Pesher on Isaiah
|3Q4|| Isaiah 1:1
|Hebrew
|Herodian
|
|
|-
|3QJub || Jubilees
|3Q5||  || Hebrew
|Herodian|| Jubilees 23:6–7, 12–13, 23
|
|-
|3QHymn || Unidentified Hymn
|3Q6|| || Hebrew
|Herodian|| Hymn of Praise
|
|-
|3QTJud(?) || Testament of Judah(?)
|3Q7|| || Hebrew
|Herodian|| cf. 4Q484, 4Q538
|
|-
|3Q Text Mentioning Angel of Peace || 
|3Q8|| ||Hebrew
|Herodian||Text about an Angel of Peace
|
|-
|3QSectarian text ||
|3Q9||
|Hebrew
|Herodian || Possible unidentified Sectarian text
|
|-
|3QUnc || Unidentified
|3Q10
3Q11
|
|Hebrew
|Hellenistic-Roman
|Unclassified fragments
|
|-
|3QUncA-B || Unclassified fragments
|3Q12
3Q13
||
|Aramaic
|Hellenistic-Roman|| Unclassified fragments
|
|-
|3QUncC || Unidentified
|3Q14||
|Hebrew?
|Hellenistic-Roman||21 unclassified fragments
|
|-
|3QCopScr || The Copper Scroll
|3Q15|| || Hebrew
|Roman|| Copper plaque mentioning buried treasures
|
|}

See also 
 Biblical manuscripts
 Septuagint manuscripts
 List of Hebrew Bible manuscripts

References

Bibliography

External links
 A Catalog of Biblical Passages in the Dead Sea Scrolls by David Washburn, 2002
 Textual Criticism: Recovering the Text of the Hebrew Bible by Peter Kyle McCarter, 1986

Dead Sea Scrolls
Qumran Cave 3